Church of the Annunciation usually refers to two churches in Nazareth:
Basilica of the Annunciation
Greek Orthodox Church of the Annunciation

It may also refer to:

Germany
 Carmelite Monastery Church of the Annunciation, Hirschhorn, Hesse

Greece
Metropolitan Cathedral of Athens

Hungary
Church of the Annunciation (Mohács)

Malta
Chapel of the Annunciation, Ħal-Millieri

Ireland
 Church of the Annunciation, in Fingal South West deanery, Fingal, Dublin 11 (1967–2018)

Italy 
 Church of the Annunciation (Alcamo)

Jerusalem
Cathedral of the Annunciation, Jerusalem

Russia
Cathedral of the Annunciation, Moscow

Slovenia
Franciscan Church of the Annunciation, in Ljubljana

United Kingdom
Church of the Annunciation, Bournemouth
Church of the Annunciation, Brighton
Church of the Annunciation, Marble Arch, London
Greek Orthodox Church of the Annunciation, Manchester
Church of the Annunciation to the Blessed Virgin Mary, Souldern

United States
Church of the Annunciation (Shelbyville, Kentucky)
Hellenic Orthodox Church of the Annunciation, Buffalo, New York
Church of the Annunciation, Cincinnati, Ohio

See also
Annunciation Church (disambiguation)
Annunciation Cathedral (disambiguation)